USS LST-927 was an  in the United States Navy. Like many of her class, she was not named and is properly referred to by her hull designation.

Construction
LST-927 was laid down on 20 May 1944, at Hingham, Massachusetts, by the Bethlehem-Hingham Shipyard; launched on 28 June 1944; and commissioned on 7 July 1944.

Service history
During World War II, LST-927 was assigned to the Asiatic-Pacific theater. She took part in the Lingayen Gulf landings in January 1945, and the Mindanao Island landings in March and April 1945.

She returned to the United States and was decommissioned on 20 July 1946, and struck from the Navy list on 8 October, that same year. On 9 December 1947, the ship was sold to the Learner Co., Oakland, California, for scrapping.

Awards
LST-927 earned two battle star for World War II service.

Notes

Citations

Bibliography 

Online resources

External links
 

 

LST-542-class tank landing ships
World War II amphibious warfare vessels of the United States
Ships built in Hingham, Massachusetts
1944 ships